The University of Puerto Rico School of Law  is a law school in Puerto Rico. It is one of the professional graduate schools of University of Puerto Rico, Río Piedras Campus and the only law school in the University of Puerto Rico System. It was founded in 1913 at its present site in Río Piedras, which at the time was an independent municipality and is now part of the City of San Juan. The School of Law has been accredited by the American Bar Association since 1945 and by the Association of American Law Schools since 1948.

Academics
The Law School's academic program aims to increase and diversify the learning and development experiences of its students. Thus, half of its 92 credit/hour study program is elective, with course offerings ranging from theoretical to practical in topics pertaining to civil rights, technology, feminism, business, international relations and comparative law, among others. In addition, students are required to participate in a clinical program. The majority of the courses are taught in Spanish.

The Law School has several programs of study.

Juris Doctor (JD)
Dual Juris Doctor and Law Degree Program (Licenciatura en Derecho) with the University of Barcelona, Spain;
Juris Doctor and Master of Business Administration with the University of Puerto Rico Graduate School of Business Administration;
Juris Doctor and Doctor of Medicine with the University of Puerto Rico School of Medicine;
Juris Doctor and Master of Public Policy with the Humphrey School of Public Affairs at the University of Minnesota;
Juris Doctor and Master in Public Administration with the University of Puerto Rico the Roberto Sánchez Vilella School of Public Administration;
Juris Doctor and Master in Architecture with the University of Puerto Rico School of Architecture; and,
Juris Doctor and International and European Legal Studies Program with the University of Antwerp, Belgium.

Graduate: LLM for Latin American and Caribbean lawyers.

Special Programs: The School of Law has students exchange programs with the University of Arizona James E. Rogers College of Law, Vermont Law School, Florida International University, the University of Connecticut School of Law, the University of Palermo in Argentina, Diego Portales University in Chile, the University of Chile Law School, the University of Ottawa Faculty of Law in Canada, the University of Antwerp in Belgium and the University of Carlos III of Madrid. Under these programs, students register at their home institution, but will take a full course load at the host institution. The credits and grades earned during a single semester will be awarded by the home institution according to the standard procedure of the home law school. Students also have a chance to participate in a summer law program at the University of Barcelona, Spain.

Also, the school has a winter exchange program with the University of Ottawa Faculty of Law in Canada, through which students can earn four credits studying Law and Technology or Law, Technology, and Feminism for one week in Canada and two weeks in Puerto Rico.

Clinical Program

In March 1974, the Puerto Rico Supreme Court approved rules for the local courts to allow students to practice law and participate in judicial proceedings. The US District Court followed suit in 1991. The school requires that students complete a two-semester clinical program in their last year of study.

Cyber Law
Intellectual Property 
Community Economic Development
Criminal Law (federal and state)
Mediation
Gay and Lesbian Rights
Environmental Law
Employment Law
Civil Cases (in general)
Juvenile Law
Immigration Law

Admissions 
The School of Law accepts students based on their academic excellence percentile. This percentile is tabulated by combining two basic criteria: the student's bachelor's degree cumulative G.P.A., as per the calculations of the Law School Admission Council (LSAC) and their LSAT results. The two criteria receive the same weight at the time of calculating the numeric ranking. Admission is offered to the best ranking students.

Also, 15 spaces are offered to the applicants selected by the Admissions Committee recommendations, chosen from a group composed of the 60 applicants following the students admitted. Throughout this process, the Committee evaluates the personal statement and writing sample, and any socioeconomic disadvantages, academic achievement, graduate studies, propensity towards academic progress, publications, extracurricular activities, and other aspects which show student's aptitude for the study of Law.

Post-graduation employment
According to the University of Puerto Rico's 2013 ABA-required disclosures, 18.24% of the Class of 2013 obtained full-time, long-term, JD-required employment nine months after graduation, excluding solo practitioners. The University of Puerto Rico's Law School Transparency under-employment score is 40.6%, indicating the percentage of the Class of 2013 unemployed, pursuing an additional degree, or working in a non-professional, short-term, or part-time job nine months after graduation.

Noted graduates
Five governors of Puerto Rico are graduates of the law school: Rafael Hernández-Colón, Carlos Romero-Barceló, Aníbal Acevedo-Vila, and Alejandro García-Padilla, and Wanda Vázquez-Garced.

Faculty
Former gubernatorial candidates Rubén Berríos and Fernando Martín García are among the law school's prominent lecturers.

Other professors and lecturers have included Chloé S. Georas, Glenda Labadie-Jackson, Santos P. Amadeo, José Julián Álvarez González, Michel Godreau Robles, Érika Fontánez Torres, Vivian Neptune, Ana Cristina Gómez, Hiram Meléndez Juarbe, Ernesto Chiesa Aponte, Olga Resumil Ramírez, Efrén Rivera Ramos, Ivette Ramos Buonomo, Luis Muñiz Argüelles, Guillermo Figueroa Prieto, Luis González Correa, Carlos Díaz Olivo, Carmelo Delgado Cintrón, Puerto Rico Supreme Court Chief Justice Liana Fiol Matta, Antonio García Padilla, Luis Aníbal Avilés, Demetrio Fernández, and Roberto Aponte Toro.

Visiting speakers have included United States Supreme Court Justices Antonin Scalia, Ruth Bader Ginsburg, Stephen Breyer, Sonia Sotomayor, and professors Laurence Tribe of Harvard Law School, Owen Fiss of Yale Law School and the late Ferdinand Stone of Tulane Law School.

Deans

Some of the deans include:

Facilities

The UPR Law School Building was designed by architect Henry Klumb and inaugurated in 1962, replacing a converted tobacco storage facility which housed the Law school for many years.  Built during David Helfeld's incumbency as Dean, it was extensively remodeled by architect Segundo Cardona, FAIA of Sierra Cardona Ferrer Architects under Antonio García Padilla's sixteen-year term (1986-2001) as the law school dean.

UPR Law School Building

The original Law School building of the University of Puerto Rico (UPR), built during David Helfeld's incumbency as Dean, replaced a converted tobacco storage facility which housed the Law school for many years. It was designed by Henry Klumb in 1961 and inaugurated in 1962. Klumb, a German architect of international renown and a disciple of Frank Lloyd Wright, was based in Puerto Rico for the latter part of his life. He left a vast body of impressive work that marked the beginning of the modern Latin American movement and exercised significant influence over contemporary tropical architecture.

Law school expansion and new library

As the Law School grew, expansion of the existing facilities became necessary. In 2001, the Law School Building was extensively remodeled and expanded under Antonio García Padilla's term as the law school dean. Klumb's designs are organic in nature and adapt well to growth and change. In the expansion of the Law School, it was decided to preserve the original stylistic expression—an architectural celebration of modernity—and to employ a vocabulary of restraint out of respect for the character of the original structure. The expansion project and new library were designed by Puerto Rican architect Segundo Cardona FAIA (Sierra Cardona Ferrer Architects), who has worked as student intern for Henry Klumb before becoming an architect himself.

The program for the project required a substantial expansion of the library and the faculty offices area, as well as construction of new facilities for the legal aid clinic and an updating of the infrastructure. The new structures were joined to the original building, preserving the integrity of the whole without concealing the individual character of each unit. Together, the reception and security areas of the library form a great open space where routes through the library converge. Visually, this area opens onto the exterior through a tall glass façade, which floods the interior with natural light, while from the exterior Klumb's original façade is reflected. This articulates the union of the old structure with the new library and maintains the continuity between the exterior and the interior, a constant in Klumb's architectural works.

The large space provides an area in which to exhibit the 70-foot-long tapestry “Madrugada” designed by the calligrapher Guillermo Rodríguez-Benítez. This monumental work forms a symbiotic relationship with its surroundings, thanks to the shape of the space, the placement of the stairs, and the interior and exterior perspectives. From the outside, the whole is unified by the restrained forms, textures and brises-soleil. The inauguration of the new library and expansion was on January 24, 2001

The design for the expansion won the 2001 Honor Award in the VI Bienal de Arquitectura - Colegio de Arquitectos y Arquitectos Paisajistas de Puerto Rico.

See also

 University of Puerto Rico, Rio Piedras Campus
 Rio Piedras

References

University of Puerto Rico
Law schools in Puerto Rico
Educational institutions established in 1913
1913 establishments in Puerto Rico